The Kent Championships also known as the Kent All-Comers' Championships was a tennis tournament played on outdoor grass courts in Foxgrove Road, Beckenham, Kent, England between 1886 and 1996 and was held in the first half of June.

History
From 1887 until 1910 the tournament was organized as an All-Comers event, the winner of which would play the title holder from previous year in the Challenge Round. The tournament was played on outdoor grass courts at Beckenham Cricket Club a multi sport club that was established in 1866 in Foxgrove Road, Beckenham with the lawn tennis section of the club established in 1879.

Herbert Chipp, later a Wimbledon umpire, came through a field of 13 entries to capture the inaugural men's singles title over Beckenham committee member Edward Avory. The Field informed its readers, "The final was a terribly tedious affair. Both players kept at the back of the court and played an excessively careful game." There were 14 pairs in the gentleman's doubles and seven pairs in the mixed doubles. The first event made a loss of £1. 10s. 9d. Two years later, from a field of 11 entries, May Jacks beat Edith Gurney to win the first women's singles tournament.

Slazenger's provided the tournament tennis balls every year from 1902, while the Challenge Round was abolished in 1911 and an Under 21 event, which became a national championship, started in 1921. When the former Soviet Union joined the International Tennis Federation in 1958, a small delegation was invited to Beckenham ahead of The Championships at Wimbledon.

The Kent Championships were the first UK tournament to have a sponsor, Rothmans, in 1963, after a special dispensation from the Lawn Tennis Association, the governing body of British tennis. Almost five years later in March 1968 at a Special General Meeting in Paris, Beckenham was awarded the status of an Open event. The club welcomed amateur and professional players to compete in the world's first Open grass-court tournament in June 1968. It was the third Open field in 1968 after the British Hard Court Championships in Bournemouth and the French Open at Roland Garros.

When a sponsor couldn't be found for the tournament after 1996, the event was consigned to tennis history. In total, 33 'double' winners (those who won the singles title at Beckenham and Wimbledon) had etched their names in Beckenham folklore.

Champions

Men's singles
Source:Beckenham Lawn Tennis Club, Kent Championships

Women's singles
Source:Beckenham Lawn Tennis Club, Kent Championships

References

Notes

External links
Kent Championships – Gentlemen’s Singles Roll of Honour
Kent Championships Tournament history
Beckenham Lawn Tennis Club history
Beckenham Cricket Club website

Sport in Kent
Grand Prix tennis circuit
Grass court tennis tournaments
Recurring sporting events established in 1886
Defunct tennis tournaments in the United Kingdom
Tennis tournaments in England